HMS Sylvia was an Adonis-class schooner of the Royal Navy during the Napoleonic War. She was built at Bermuda using Bermudan cedar and completed in 1806. She took part in one notable single-ship action in the East Indies in 1810. The Navy sold her in 1816 and she then became a merchantman. She was wrecked in 1823 on a voyage to West Africa.

Career
Sylvia was commissioned in March 1806 under the command of Lieutenant Lewis Krumpholtz. In 1807 Lieutenant Augustus Vere Drury took command and sailed her for the Channel station.

On 18 August Sylvia captured the Danish vessel Generalindo Waltersloff. Then on 7 September she was at the Battle of Copenhagen. From there Sylvia carried the British ambassador back to Britain.

Between 30 November 1807 and 6 March 1808 Sylvia was at Sheerness undergoing repairs. Drury then sailed on 7 May 1808 for the Cape of Good Hope.

Then on 8 April 1809 she sailed for the East Indies. One year later, in April 1810, Sylvia had a most demanding month. She was proceeding through the Sunda Strait when near Krakatoa she had three times to deal with attacks by pirate proas.

The first attack occurred on 6 April. Sylvia drove the proa ashore and destroyed it after first removing the vessel's 6-pounder gun. The proa had had a crew of some 50 men.

The second attack took place the next day. Drury sent out a boat manned by volunteers and under the command of an officer, to harass the attacker. Eventually the British captured the proa, which was armed with two 6-pounder guns and had a crew of 30 men. Pirate casualties amounted to two men killed and one wounded; the British had no casualties.

The last attack occurred on 11 April. Sylvia sighted a lugger proa at anchor under Krakatoa that got under weigh as the British approached. Drury sent Sub-Lieutenant Chesnaye and another party of volunteers in the proa that Sylvia had captured on 7 April. As the British proa approached the lugger, the lugger took flight and both proas passed behind an island that shielded them from Sylvias sight. When Sylvia finally caught up with the two, the British were about to board the pirate lugger proa, which was putting up a stiff resistance. Sylvia opened fire on the enemy until the lugger sank. She had been armed with three 18-pounders and had had a crew of 72 men; pirate casualties were unknown. The British suffered eight men severely wounded, one of whom later died.

However, Sylvias greatest fight was yet to come. On 26 April she sighted three armed brigs and two lug sail vessels near Edam Island (now Damar Besam in Indonesia's Thousand Islands), making all haste towards Batavia. Sylvia was able to catch up with and bring to action the last-most brig, the Dutch navy brig Echo, of eight 6-pounder guns and 46 men, under the command of Lieutenant Christian Thaarup. Echo surrendered after a sharp engagement of 20 minutes duration. In the action, the Dutch lost three men killed and seven wounded; the British lost four men killed and three wounded.

As soon as she could return to the pursuit Sylvia did so, but the two Dutch brigs were able to escape to the shelter of the batteries on Onrust Island (now Kelor in the Thousand Islands). Still, she was able to capture the two transports, each of which had a crew of 60 men and was armed with two 9-pounder guns. The two transports were 12 days out of Surabaya and were carrying "Artillery Equipage and valuable European Goods." Drury received promotion to commander for his victory, with a date of 2 May 1810. In 1847, the Admiralty awarded the Naval General service Medal with clasp "Sylvia 26 April 1810" to the single surviving claimant from the action.

In 1811 Lieutenant Richard Crawford replaced Drury. By 1812 Sylvia was on the Downs station under the command of Lieutenant Robert Palk. He commanded her at the siege of San Sebastián, which took place between 7 July and 8 September 1813. In January 1819 Parliament voted a grant to the crews of the vessels, including Sylvia, that had served under the command of Lord Viscount Keith in the Channel in 1813 and 1814.  November 1822 saw the last (third) payment of the grant.

Between August 1814 and July 1815 Sylvia was at Portsmouth being fitted out as a dispatch vessel. In June 1815 Lieutenant Joseph Griffiths recommissioned her.

Disposal: In January 1816 the Admiralty put Sylvia up for sale at Plymouth. She was sold for £710 on 30 May 1816.

Merchantman
Mercantile interests purchased Sylvia. The supplemental pages to the 1816 Register of Shipping shows Sylvia, Bermuda-built in 1806, of 138 tons (bm), with W. Jewell, master, and Jewell, owner. Her voyage is Plymouth-London. 

On 10 January 1821, Sylvia, Hill, master, put into Plymouth. She had been sailing from Dublin to London but lost her mainmast and had sprung her foremast.

Loss
Sylvia was under the command of Captain Boxwell (or Boxell, or Buxall) when she wrecked on the Bissagoa Shoals, off the coast of Africa. She was on a voyage from London to Cape Coast Castle, Gold Coast. Lloyd's List reported the loss on 3 February 1824, suggesting that Sylvia was lost in late 1823.

Notes, citations, and references
Notes

Citations

References
  

1806 ships
Adonis-class schooners
Age of Sail merchant ships
Merchant ships of the United Kingdom
Maritime incidents in 1823
Ships built in Bermuda